Biascas de Obarra is a locality located in the municipality of Beranuy, in Huesca province, Aragon, Spain. As of 2020, it has a population of 10.

Geography 
Biascas de Obarra is located 121km east-northeast of Huesca.

References

Populated places in the Province of Huesca